Allison Vest (born June 26, 1995) is a Canadian rock climber renowned for her accomplishments in bouldering and lead climbing. She is known for winning the Canadian Bouldering Nationals in 2018 and 2020. She also came first in Canadian Lead Nationals in 2019, and placed 10th in the World Beach Games in Doha, Qatar in 2019. In August 2019, Vest became the first female Canadian climber to a conquer a V13 boulder, successfully sending The Terminator in Squamish, British Columbia. This feat was documented in the film 'The Terminator', which premiered at the Vancouver International Mountain Film Festival on March 1, 2020.

Biography 

Born in St. Paul, Minnesota, Vest relocated to Canmore, Alberta with her family when she was seven. She retains dual citizenship. Living in the Canadian Rockies, she began competitive climbing at age 9, and joined the Canadian National Team as a teenager.

Vest is nicknamed "Albatross" because of her 7+ ape index. At , her wingspan is  longer than her height.

Canadian Nationals Performance

Personal life 
She has garnered a following on social media as a result of her humorous and satirical training videos.

She began her studies at the University of Alberta and transferred to the University of British Columbia in 2015 to study kinesiology. She is sponsored by Black Diamond, Tension Climbing, RhinoSkin Solutions, and Hive Climbing. In her spare time, she was a youth team coach at the Hive Climbing Gym in Vancouver.

Since spring 2020, she has lived in Salt Lake City to live and train with friend and American climber Kyra Condie, and the pair began documenting their training on their shared TikTok account, @climbingroommates.

References

1995 births
Living people
Female climbers
People from Canmore, Alberta
Sportspeople from Saint Paul, Minnesota
American emigrants to Canada
Sportspeople from Alberta
Canadian rock climbers